Boris Nikolov may refer to:

 Boris Nikolov (footballer), Bulgarian footballer
 Boris Nikolov (boxer) (1929–2017), Bulgarian boxer